Akodon azarae, also known as Azara's akodont or Azara's grass mouse, is a rodent species from South America. It is found from southernmost Brazil through Paraguay and Uruguay into eastern Argentina. It is named after Spanish naturalist Félix de Azara.

References

Literature cited
D'Elia, G. and Pardinas, U. 2008. . In IUCN. IUCN Red List of Threatened Species. Version 2009.2. <www.iucnredlist.org>. Downloaded on April 2, 2010.
Musser, G.G. and Carleton, M.D. 2005. Superfamily Muroidea. Pp. 894–1531 in Wilson, D.E. and Reeder, D.M. (eds.). Mammal Species of the World: a taxonomic and geographic reference. 3rd ed. Baltimore: The Johns Hopkins University Press, 2 vols., 2142 pp. 

Mammals of Argentina
Mammals of Brazil
Mammals of Paraguay
Mammals of Uruguay
Rodents of South America
Akodon
Mammals described in 1829
Stored-product pests
Taxa named by Johann Baptist Fischer